"I Want You" is a song by Paris Avenue featuring Robin One. It was released late 2004.

Track listings
 Belgian single 
 "I Want You" (Radio edit) – 3:25
 "Simply" – 4:26

 Scandinavian single 
 "I Want You" (Radio edit) – 3:25
 "I Want You" (Extended mix) – 6:48
 "Simply" – 4:26
 "I Want You" (video)

Charts

References

2004 singles
2004 songs